Dariusz Pender (born 16 October 1974) is a Polish wheelchair fencer. In 2000, he won the gold medal in the men's épée individual A event at the 2000 Summer Paralympics held in Sydney, Australia. He also won the silver medal in the men's foil team event. Pender also won medals at the Summer Paralympics in 2004, 2008, 2012 and 2016.

References

External links 
 

Living people
1974 births
Place of birth missing (living people)
Paralympic wheelchair fencers of Poland
Wheelchair fencers at the 2000 Summer Paralympics
Wheelchair fencers at the 2004 Summer Paralympics
Wheelchair fencers at the 2008 Summer Paralympics
Wheelchair fencers at the 2012 Summer Paralympics
Wheelchair fencers at the 2016 Summer Paralympics
Paralympic gold medalists for Poland
Paralympic silver medalists for Poland
Paralympic bronze medalists for Poland
Medalists at the 2000 Summer Paralympics
Medalists at the 2004 Summer Paralympics
Medalists at the 2008 Summer Paralympics
Medalists at the 2012 Summer Paralympics
Medalists at the 2016 Summer Paralympics
21st-century Polish people
20th-century Polish people